Gertrude Ella Mead (1867–1919) was an Australian medical doctor and advocate for women and children. Mead was the third woman doctor registered in Western Australia. She was a founder of the Child protection society of Western Australia as well as an early advocate for homes for the aged and daycare centres.

Early life and education
Gertrude Ella Mead was born on 31 December 1867 in Adelaide, the third child of Baptist minister Silas Mead and Ann Mead (née Staples). She attended the Advanced School for Girls alongside her sister Lilian, the first public secondary school in South Australia and the first school to allow girls to matriculate and qualify for university. She matriculated in 1884 with second class honours.

Mead initially trained in nursing at the Adelaide Children's Hospital from 1890 to 1891, and then began a MBBS at Adelaide University, graduating from the University of Melbourne in 1897. She spent two years in the United Kingdom working as a resident physician and house surgeon.

Career
Mead returned to Australia in 1901 and was the third woman registered as a doctor in Western Australia. She practiced from her home in Perth, with a focus on women and children's health. She was a medical officer for the House of Mercy for unmarried mothers from 1904 to 1907, and physician for the Perth Children's Hospital which opened in 1909. When the King Edward Memorial Hospital opened in 1916, she was the obstetric representative of the Australasian Trained Nurses' Association. She also represented that association on the Western Australian Council for Venereal Disease and presented a report in 1918 calling for greater education of nurses on the subject. She proposed the idea of district nurses in Perth.

Mead was a member of the Karrakatta Club, the first women's club in Australia, and served as vice president from 1912 to 1914, as well as chairwoman of various programs. She gave talks on women's work and international issues, and Red Cross work. In 1912, she was appointed as medical representative to the inaugural Senate of the University of Western Australia, one of two women of the 18 members chosen by the government, who began to advocate for women's rights at the university. Mead remained on the university's senate and education committee for the rest of her life.

During World War I, Mead taught Red Cross nurses and was a medical officer at the Fremantle Base Hospital as well as a Perth divisional surgeon. She was a life member of St John Ambulance Brigade.

Mead was one of the founders of the Children's Protection Society of Western Australia in 1906, which tried to "control the worst abuses of 'baby farming' and began to license foster mothers who were suitable to care for needy children." In 1909, she wrote in Dependent Children, "It is only within the last century that the civilised world has slowly awakened to a sense of its responsibility towards the children born of white parents who come under the heading of "unwanted"."

In 1912, Mead joined the committee of the Silver Chain Nursing League and proposed a scheme to build cottage homes for elderly people. The first such cottage, on Wright Street in North Perth was designed and furnished by Mead and Muriel Chase. She began to investigate a similar idea for old people's homes in Adelaide. In 1907, Mead wrote a paper called "Medical Missions" for the WA Baptist magazine, emphasising the need for doctors to "embrace spiritual work as well as regular medical care - to win souls while healing bodies." Mead was a member of the Perth Central Baptist Church, where her brother-in-law A.S. Wilson was the pastor. She was known for her "deep compassion for the poor."

Death and legacy
Mead returned to Adelaide in 1919 to visit her brother, a medical missionary in India who was on leave. She suffered a cerebral embolism and died on 6 November 1919. She is buried in the West Terrace Cemetery. Upon her death,The Bulletin newspaper called her "one of [Perth's] most useful citizens."

The Silver Chain Cottage Homes in Perth were opened in 1920, and in 1981 the only surviving home was renamed "Dr Gertrude Mead Cottage Home". In 1987, the federal government named Mead St in Chisholm, Australian Capital Territory after her.

References

1867 births
1919 deaths
People from Adelaide
University of Adelaide Medical School alumni
Melbourne Medical School alumni
Australian women medical doctors
Australian medical doctors
19th-century Australian medical doctors
20th-century Australian medical doctors
Children's rights activists
Australian women's rights activists
Burials at West Terrace Cemetery
Australian Baptists
People educated at the Advanced School for Girls
Australian people of English descent